FK Železničar Niš is a defunct football club based in Niš, Serbia.

History
Founded in 1928, the club initially competed in the Niš Football Subassociation League, winning the title in 1939 and 1941. They subsequently participated in the 1946–47 Yugoslav First League as 14. Oktobar, immediately suffering relegation. Later on, the club competed for five seasons in the Yugoslav Second League from 1962 to 1967.

Notable players
National team players
  Saša Simonović

References

External links
 Club page at Srbijasport

1928 establishments in Serbia
2012 disestablishments in Serbia
Association football clubs disestablished in 2012
Association football clubs established in 1928
Defunct football clubs in Serbia
Football clubs in Yugoslavia
Railway association football clubs in Serbia
Sport in Niš